Anu Helena Vehviläinen (born 9 September 1963) is a Finnish politician for the Centre Party who served as Speaker of the Finnish Parliament from 2020 to 2022. She has previously held various cabinet positions, including Finland's Minister of Local Government and Public Reforms in the Sipilä Cabinet from 2015 to 2019; Minister of Transport from May to June 2019; and Minister of Transport in the Vanhanen II and Kiviniemi cabinets from 2007 to 2011.

Early life and education 
Vehviläinen was born in Leppävirta. She has a master's degree in Philosophy and is preparing a doctorate degree at the University of Joensuu.

Political career 
During his time in parliament, Vehviläinen served on the Committee on Education (1995–1999) and the Committee on Social Affairs and Health (2011–2015, 2019–2020), among others.

From 2015 to 2019, Vehviläinen served as Minister of Local Government and Public Reforms in the cabinet of Prime Minister Juha Sipilä.

In 2020, Vehviläinen was appointed Speaker of the Finnish Parliament after Matti Vanhanen had been appointed Minister of Finance in the Marin Cabinet.

Other activities 
 Finnish Innovation Fund (SITRA), Member of the Board (since 2020)

Honors 

  Order of the Lion of Finland (Finland, 2022)

References

External links 
 Anu Vehviläinen's official website

1963 births
Living people
People from Leppävirta
Centre Party (Finland) politicians
Ministers of Transport and Public Works of Finland
Members of the Parliament of Finland (1995–99)
Members of the Parliament of Finland (1999–2003)
Members of the Parliament of Finland (2007–11)
Members of the Parliament of Finland (2011–15)
Members of the Parliament of Finland (2015–19)
Members of the Parliament of Finland (2019–23)
Women government ministers of Finland
21st-century Finnish women politicians
Women members of the Parliament of Finland
Recipients of the Order of the Cross of Terra Mariana, 1st Class